Robinson is a city in and the county seat of Crawford County, Illinois, United States. The population was 7,150 at the 2020 census, down from 7,713 at the 2010 census.

Geography
Illinois Route 33 passes through the center of the city as Main Street, leading east  to Palestine near the Indiana border and west  to Newton.

Climate

According to the Köppen Climate Classification system, Robinson has a humid subtropical climate, abbreviated "Cfa" on climate maps.

Demographics
As of the 2020 census there were 7,150 people, 2,611 households, and 1,605 families residing in the city. The racial makeup of the city was 83.83% White, 7.83% African American, 0.36% Native American, 0.62% Asian, 0.01% Pacific Islander, 3.09% from other races, and 4.25% from two or more races. Hispanic or Latino of any race were 4.80% of the population.

There were 2,611 households, out of which 40.33% had children under the age of 18 living with them, 43.70% were married couples living together, 14.44% had a female householder with no husband present, and 38.53% were non-families. 33.55% of all households were made up of individuals, and 17.92% had someone living alone who was 65 years of age or older. The average household size was 2.42 and the average family size was 2.00.

The city's age distribution consisted of 14.8% under the age of 18, 8.3% from 18 to 24, 34.5% from 25 to 44, 25.3% from 45 to 64, and 17.1% who were 65 years of age or older. The median age was 40.0 years. For every 100 females, there were 162.3 males. For every 100 females age 18 and over, there were 169.9 males.

The median income for a household in the city was $45,137, and the median income for a family was $61,625. Males had a median income of $42,642 versus $25,938 for females. The per capita income for the city was $20,646. About 12.6% of families and 15.1% of the population were below the poverty line, including 13.1% of those under age 18 and 12.0% of those age 65 or over.

Major employers in the town include a refinery owned by Marathon Petroleum Company and a chocolate factory for the Heath bar, first made in 1914, now distributed by The Hershey Company.

Notable people 
 Lisa Brown (born 1956), member of the Washington State Legislature from 1993 to 2013.
 Robert Brubaker, actor (Gunsmoke)
 Calli Cox, adult film actress
 Caswell J. Crebs, Justice of the Illinois Supreme Court
 Joseph B. Crowley, U.S. congressman
 Perry Graves, 1914 first-team All-American football player for the University of Illinois and Big Ten official
 James Jones, author (From Here to Eternity, The Thin Red Line, Some Came Running)
 Meyers Leonard, former basketball center for the Miami Heat
 Skip Martin, musician and arranger
 Frankie Masters, band leader 
 Robert S. Wiseman, war technology researcher and innovator of night vision

Media
Robinson Daily News

Schools
The following schools are operated by Robinson Community Unit School District 2:
Robinson High School - grades 9-12
Nuttall Middle School - grades 6-8
Lincoln Grade School - grades 3-5
Washington Elementary School - grades PreK-2

References

External links
City of Robinson official website
Robinson Chamber of Commerce
Robinson Daily News

Cities in Crawford County, Illinois
Cities in Illinois
County seats in Illinois